Lorenzo Borri (born 24 September 1997) is an Italian professional footballer who plays as a centre back for Serie C club Monterosi.

Club career
On 22 July 2021 he joined Monterosi.

References

External links

1997 births
Living people
Italian footballers
Association football defenders
Serie C players
Serie D players
Eccellenza players
Empoli F.C. players
U.S. Poggibonsi players
U.S. Città di Pontedera players
S.S. Juve Stabia players
A.S. Pro Piacenza 1919 players
Carrarese Calcio players
Monterosi Tuscia F.C. players